Smidtia conspersa is a species of tachinid fly.

Distribution
Albania, Andorra, Austria, Belgium, Bulgaria, Czech Republic, Denmark, Finland, France, Germany, Greece, Hungary, Italy, Norway, Poland, Romania, Slovakia,  Spain, Sweden, Switzerland, Netherlands, Ukraine, United Kingdom.

References

Exoristinae
Diptera of Europe
Insects described in 1824